Mr. Nice Guy may refer to:

Nice guy, a man who portrays himself with characteristics such as being gentle, compassionate, sensitive and vulnerable
Mr. Nice Guy (1987 film), starring Mike MacDonald and Jan Smithers
Mr. Nice Guy (1997 film), starring Jackie Chan and Richard Norton
Mr. Nice Guy (EP), a 2004 EP by Trine Dyrholm

See also
Nice Guy (disambiguation)
No More Mr. Nice Guy (disambiguation)